
This is a list of the Areas of Special Scientific Interest (ASSIs) in Northern Ireland, United Kingdom. In Northern Ireland the body responsible for designating ASSIs is the Northern Ireland Environment Agency - a division of the Department of Environment (DoE).

Unlike the SSSIs, ASSIs include both natural environments and man-made structures. As with SSSIs, these sites are designated if they have criteria based on fauna, flora, geological or physiographical features. On top of this, structures are also covered, such as the Whitespots mines in Conlig, according to several criterion including rarity, recorded history and intrinsic appeal.

For other sites in the rest of the United Kingdom, see List of SSSIs by Area of Search.

Notes 
Rounded to two decimal places.
As yet unconfirmed. Year displayed is year of declaration.

References 

Northern Ireland
Northern Ireland coast and countryside
Areas of Special
Geography of Northern Ireland
Conservation in Northern Ireland